The 2016 Euro RX of Norway was the fourth round of the forty-first season of the FIA European Rallycross Championship. The event was held at the Lånkebanen near Hell, Nord-Trøndelag as an undercard to the 2016 World RX of Norway, and hosted the Supercar and TouringCar classes.

Supercar

Heats

Semi-finals
Semi-Final 1

Semi-Final 2

Final

TouringCar

Heats

Semi-finals
Semi-Final 1

Semi-Final 2

Final

Standings after the event

Supercar standings

TouringCar standings

 Note: Only the top five positions are included for both sets of standings.

References

|- style="text-align:center"
|width="35%"|Previous race:2016 Euro RX of Great Britain
|width="35%"|FIA European RallycrossChampionship2016 season
|width="35%"|Next race:2016 Euro RX of Sweden

Norway
Euro RX